Kurtköy High School is a secondary public anatolian school located in Pendik, Istanbul, Turkey.

History
KHS (Kurtköy High School) was established in 1990, with 107 students, as a standard high school. In 2012, the school became an Anatolian High School.

About
KHS serves around 1,200 grade 9–12 students. The teacher-student ratio is c.18. There are 41 classrooms, three
science laboratories, one painting workshop and a library in the school.

References 

High schools in Istanbul
Pendik
Educational institutions established in 1990
1990 establishments in Turkey